Barbra Mathilde Ring (4 July 1870 – 6 May 1955) was a Norwegian novelist, short story writer, children's writer, biographer, memoirist, literary critic and theatre critic. She made her literary début in 1904 with the girl's novel Babbens Dagbog. Her children's books about "Peik" and other characters achieved great popularity. Her first novel for adults was Jomfruen, published in 1914.

Ring is probably best remembered for her children's books. Her folkloric story "Itte no knussel" (from the story collection Fnugg) is also characterized as a little pearl, and her novel Eldjarstad is named as her best work in this genre.

Personal life
Ring was born in Drammen to judge Ole Ring and Thora Augusta Ravn. She was the great-granddaughter of Hanna Winsnes. She married wholesaler Thorvald Kirsebom in 1890, and they had the daughter Gerda Ring in 1891. The couple divorced in 1902. In 1917 she married colonel Ragnar Rosenquist.

Selected works
 Babbens Dagbog, 1904 
 Tertit, 1905
 Lillefru Tertit, 1906
 Vildbasser, 1906 (short stories)
 Tvillinger og andre barn, 1907 (short stories)
 Anne Karine Corvin, 1907 
 Fjeldmus paa utenlands-reise, 1908
 To Aar efter, 1908 
 Fnugg, 1909 (short stories)
 Riebes paa Star, 1910
 Da Peik skulde gjøre sin Lykke, 1910 
 Peik, 1911 
 Billet mrk. "286". En Fortælling om en ung Pige, 1911
 Fra Hanna Winsnes' Prestegaard, 1911
 Den rette, 1912
 Den kjærligheten, 1913 (short stories)
 Rædharen, 1913
 Jomfruen, 1914 (novel)
 Før kulden kommer, 1915
 Under seil, 1916
 Veien, 1917
 Vildbasser og andre Fortællinger. Rædharen, 1919
 Guldkappen, 1919
 To, 1920
 Mennesket Fernanda Nissen, 1921 (biography of Fernanda Nissen)
 Kredsen, 1921 
 Kongens hjerte, 1922 (children's comedy, staged at Nationaltheatret)
 Søstre, 1922 
 En mand, 1923
 For hundrede Aar siden. Hanna Winsnes og Hendes., 1924 (biography)
 Unge fruer, 1924
 Vi fraskilte barn. Ved et av dem, 1924
 Vi som vandrer, 1926
 Kvinde, 1927
 Lille-Mette, 1928
 Dengang da jeg var pige, 1928 (memoirs)
 Minder og små bekjendelser, 1929 (memoirs)
 Nu, 1930
 Eldjarstad, 1931 
 Et år gikk rundt, 1932
 Elven strømmer, 1933
 Chansen, 1934
 Jolle, 1934
 Leken på Ladeby, 1936
 Leken blir liv, 1937 
 Marcus Gjøgs medaljong, 1938
 Farlig start, 1939 
 Sånn er Norge, 1940
 Mellom venner og fiender, 1947 (memoirs)

References

Bibliography

1870 births
1955 deaths
People from Drammen
Norwegian children's writers
Norwegian biographers
Norwegian literary critics
Women literary critics
Norwegian theatre critics
Norwegian women non-fiction writers
Norwegian women novelists
Norwegian memoirists
Women biographers
Norwegian women children's writers
Norwegian women editors
20th-century biographers
20th-century Norwegian women writers
20th-century Norwegian novelists
Women memoirists